Faruk Kabir (born as Faruk Kabir on 18 March 1983) is an Indian film director, writer and producer who is mainly known for his work in Hindi films. Kabir started his career as an assistant director in films like Phir Bhi Dil Hai Hindustani and Asoka. He made his directorial debut in 2006 with The Awakening, a short film, starring Ajay Devgn. He then rose to fame with Allah Ke Banday, which he directed and acted in as well.

Career
Having started his career at a young age of 18 as an assistant director to veterans like Aziz Mirza and Santosh Sivan, Kabir worked on films like Phir Bhi Dil Hai Hindustani and Asoka. He then joined the New York Film Academy (NYFA) in screenwriting and filmmaking. He was also an assistant director on the film Pyaar Ishq Aur Mohabbat.

Kabir later became an independent director with the acclaimed documentary Unheard Voices Of The People Of India, for which he travelled 27000 kilometres by road. The documentary was produced by Saeed Mirza. In 2006, he marked his directorial debut with the short film The Awakening, which starred Ajay Devgan.  The film brought forth the issue of water disasters, and was applauded by the audiences.

Kabir debuted as a director and actor for feature films with Allah Ke Banday, which brought together an ensemble star cast including Naseeruddin Shah, Sharman Joshi, Atul Kulkarni to name a few. The film, which dealt with juvenile crime, was well received by the audiences. The film was also screened at the Chicago Film Festival. The film went on to receive 13 nominations in 2011, including Best Debut Director nominations for Kabir at the Filmfare and Star Screen Awards and others at the Stardust, Balaji and IIFA Awards.

Kabir married actress Rukhsar Rehman in 2010. Rukhsar and Kabir were in a relationship for six years before they tied the knot on 23 March 2010.

Kabir has also directed over a dozen music videos with artists like Sanober and Jassi. Kabir is a part of and has associated with the Super Fight League, which holds martial arts related events that are aired on Indian television. He collaborated with SFL and BodyPower UK for the Body Power Expo which was held in March 2014. Kabir has expertise in Boxing, Taekwondo, Brazilian Jujutsu, Judo and the Israeli combat art of Krav Maga.

Shockers
Kabir is currently directing Shockers, India’s first horror web series, which he has created in association with Spiders Web, his production house. The series currently airs on online platform Hotstar, and features actors like Kalki Koechlin, Dia Mirza, Amit Sadh, Amyra Dastur, Rajat Barmecha, Neha Mahajan, Jaideep Ahlawat and Prateik Babbar. Season 3 is rumored to have Arjun Rampal.

Other work
Apart from directing and acting in films, Kabir has also directed over a dozen music videos with T-Series, and artists like Sanober, Jassi and Mikka. He has also produced for the NCPA Theatre Festival with plays like Bade Miyan Diwanae and Falsafa, and has also directed TVCs for UP Tourism, Jabong and Tata to name a few. He has also been an Honorary Creative Director for Mumbai’s largest out of home media company, RoshanSpace.

Filmography

References

External links
 
 Indias first MMA action star: Faruk Kabir
 https://www.instagram.com/farukkabir9/?hl=en

Living people
21st-century Indian male actors
1983 births
Indian male boxers
Indian male judoka
Indian male taekwondo practitioners